The 2nd round of the inaugural British Formula 3000 Championship, saw the series arrive in Hampshire, for a race at the Thruxton Circuit, on 27 March.

Report

Entry
A total of 10 F3000 cars were entered for this, the second round of the 1989 British F3000 Championship. Come raceday only nine would start the race.

Qualifying
Andrew Gilbert-Scott took pole position for Eddie Jordan Racing team in their Cosworth-engined Reynard 88D.

Race
The race was held over 40 laps of the fast Thruxton circuit. Gary Brabham took the winner spoils for the Bromley Motorsport team, driving their Reynard-Cosworth 88D. The Aussie won in a time of 44:01.83mins., averaging a speed of 128.434 mph. Second place went to Roland Ratzenberger in Spirit Motorsport’s Reynard-Cosworth 88D, who was just 1.90ecs behind. Poleman and winner of the first-ever British F3000 race, Andrew Gilbert-Scott completed the podium for the Eddie Jordan Racing in his Cosworth engined Reynard 88D, albeit one lap down.

Classification

Race

Class winners in bold

 Fastest lap: Roland Ratzenberger, 1:04.44secs. (131.564 mph)

References

British Formula 3000 Championship